Mahendra Rao is a researcher known for his work involving human embryonic stem cells and other somatic stem cells.  In 2011, Rao was appointed Director of the National Institutes of Health Center for Regenerative Medicine.

Biography
Rao received his MBBS from Bombay University, India, and then earned a PhD in developmental neurobiology from California Institute of Technology.

After postdoctoral work at Case Western Reserve, he became an independent researcher at University of Utah. Next he joined the National Institute of Aging, where he studied neural progenitor cells and their potential clinical use. Rao was also the VP of Regenerative Medicine at Life Technologies. Additionally, he co-founded Q Therapeutics, a stem-cell research firm and serves on USDA Cellular Tissue and Gene Therapies  advisory committee and more.

Rao also holds a joint research appointment in NIAMS and NINDS.

Recent Publications

References

Indian medical researchers
Living people
Year of birth missing (living people)